Moneta is a given name and surname that may refer to
Given name
 Moneta Sleet Jr. (1926–1996), African-American photographaper, Pulitzer Prize winner

Surname
 Claudio Moneta (born 1967), Italian voice actor
 Ernesto Teodoro Moneta (1833–1918), Italian journalist and international activist, nobel peace prize winner
 Juno Moneta, ancient Roman goddess
 Łukasz Moneta (born 1994), Polish association football player
 Tullio Moneta, South African actor
 Moneta family, a 15th-century noble family